In mathematics, in the field of ordinary differential equations, the Sturm–Picone comparison theorem, named after Jacques Charles François Sturm and Mauro Picone, is a classical theorem which provides criteria for the oscillation and non-oscillation of solutions of certain linear differential equations in the real domain.

Let ,  for  be real-valued continuous functions on the interval  and let
 

be two homogeneous linear second order differential equations in self-adjoint form with

and

Then one of the following properties holds.

The first part of the conclusion is due to Sturm (1836), while the second (alternative) part of the theorem is due to Picone (1910) whose simple proof was given using his now famous Picone identity. In the special case where both equations are identical one obtains the Sturm separation theorem.

Notes

References 

Diaz, J. B.; McLaughlin, Joyce R. Sturm comparison theorems for ordinary and partial differential equations. Bull. Amer. Math. Soc. 75 1969 335–339 
 Heinrich Guggenheimer (1977) Applicable Geometry, page 79, Krieger, Huntington  .

Ordinary differential equations
Theorems in analysis